Ne zovi me, ne traži me (English translation: Don't Call Me, Don't Look for Me) is the twelfth studio album of Bosnian singer Halid Bešlić. It was released in 1996.

Track listing
Sanjam te, majko (I Dream of You, Mother)
Vjetrovi i oluje (Winds or Storms)
Plakat ću, ljubavi moja (I'll Cry, My Love)
Pjesme moje (My Songs)
Ne zovi me, ne traži me (Don't Call Me, Don't Look for Me)
Sjeti me se, bistra rijeko (Remember Me, Clear River)
Noć i dan se dijeli (Night and Day is Divided)
Sarajka djevojka (Sarajevo Girl)

References

1996 albums
Halid Bešlić albums